The 1997 Embassy World Professional Darts Championship was held from 4–12 January 1997 at the Lakeside Country Club in Frimley Green, Surrey.  It was won by Les Wallace, who became the second Scotsman to become World Darts Champion after Jocky Wilson won it twice in 1982 and 1989.  Wallace defeated Wales' Marshall James 6–3 in the final.  Wallace also became the first left-handed player to win either version of the World Darts Championship.  It was also the second time in four years that two unseeded players had reached the Embassy final, and remains the most recent occasion that this has occurred.

Seeds
  Martin Adams
  Roland Scholten
  Raymond van Barneveld
  Richie Burnett
  Steve Beaton
  Colin Monk
  Ronnie Baxter
  Andy Fordham

Prize money
The prize money was £152,400.

Champion: £38,000
Runner-Up: £19,000
Semi-Finalists (2): £8,700
Quarter-Finalists (4): £4,400
Last 16 (8): £3,350
Last 32 (16): £2,100

There was also a 9 Dart Checkout prize of £52,000, along with a High Checkout prize of £1,600.

The Results

References

BDO World Darts Championships
BDO World Darts Championship
BDO World Darts Championship
BDO World Darts Championship
Sport in Surrey
Frimley Green